Ross Smith may refer to:

Australian rules footballers
Ross G. Smith (born 1942), Australian rules footballer for St Kilda
Ross W. Smith (born 1965), Australian rules footballer for North Melbourne

Association footballers
Ross Smith (Scottish footballer) (born 1992), Scottish association football player
Ross Smith (soccer) (born 1980), Canadian association football player

Other sportspeople
Ross Smith (ice hockey) (born 1953), Canadian ice hockey player
Ross Smith (badminton) (born 1985), Australian badminton player
Ross Smith (darts player) (born 1989), English darts player
Ross Smith (rugby union) (1929–2002), New Zealand rugby union player

Others
Ross Macpherson Smith (1892–1922), Australian aviator
Ross Smith (Australian politician) (born 1938), member of the Victorian Legislative Assembly

See also
Ross Smith Secondary School, Australia, named after the aviator